Chin Saik Yoon is the head of Southbound, an academic publishing house based in Penang, Malaysia. Chin founded Southbound in 1990, "to provide a voice for researchers and practitioners" in both the South and the North concerning issues related to development. Southbound has since specialised in titles relating to development communication, and ICT4D (Information and Communication Technologies for Development).

Chin is also the chief editor of the Digital Review of Asia-Pacific, a bi-annual publication that looks at how ICT (information and communication technology) is deployed in support of socio-economic development of the economies in the Asia-Pacific region. He is also a practitioner of participatory development communication, which aims to facilitate bottom-up processes that put people in charge of their own development.

External links
Southbound
Digital Review of Asia-Pacific

Year of birth missing (living people)
Living people
Malaysian publishers (people)